Chuniophoeniceae is a tribe of palms in subfamily Coryphoideae of plant family Arecaceae. The four genera within the tribe are morphologically dissimilar and do not have overlapping distributions. Three of the genera are monotypic, while the fourth genus (Chuniophoenix) has three species.

Description 
Outwardly, the palms in the four genera of Chuniophoeniceae appear quite different. Chuniophoenix are small palms from the forest understory with clustered stems; Kerriodoxa is a squat, single-stemmed rainforest palm; Nannorrhops is a sprawling desert palm with branching stems; and Tahina is a massive solitary palm from exposed limestone outcrops. They differ significantly in their flowering strategies, too. Chuniophoenix species flower regularly throughout their lives (pleonanthic) and produce hermaphroditic flowers (rarely single gender); Kerriodoxa are also pleonanthic, but are always dioecious; Nannorrhops stems die after flowering (hapaxanthic), though the much-branched plant survives; Tahina produces a massive terminal inflorescence and dies after fruiting. All Chuniophoeniceae have palmate leaves with induplicate folds and tubular bracts partially enclosing the flowers.

Taxonomy 
Chuniophoeniceae is one of eight tribes in subfamily Coryphoideae. The tribe is monophyletic and closely related to tribes Caryoteae, Corypheae and Borasseae, forming the syncarpous clade. In a previous classification, prior to the discovery of Tahina, the three other genera were placed in tribe Corypheae, subtribe Coryphinae, together with the genus Corypha. Coincidentally, Corypha and Tahina both share the strategy of producing a massive display of flowers only once before dying.

The four genera have widely disjunct distributions. Chuniophoenix (3 spp.) is found in southern China and Vietnam; Kerriodoxa (1 sp., K. elegans) is restricted to peninsular Thailand; Nannorrhops (1 sp., N. ritchiana) is found in parts of Iran, Afghanistan, Pakistan and the southeastern Arabian Peninsula; while Tahina (1 sp., T. spectabilis) is endemic to a small area of northwestern Madagascar.

Genera

Gallery

References 

Coryphoideae
Monocot tribes